Francis D. Kimball was a Republican politician from the state of Ohio. He was Ohio Attorney General in 1856.

Kimball was born 1820 in New Hampshire. He was reared as a Whig and an Abolitionist. In 1842 he moved to Medina County, Ohio, and was soon elected to county office. He was prosecuting attorney of Medina County 1849-1853. He was a champion of the Anti-Nebraska Movement in 1854, and a founder of the Republican Party in Ohio. He attended the preliminary National Convention at Pittsburgh, and the first regular National Convention at Philadelphia, where he contracted a disease that would lead to his death. He was nominated for Ohio Attorney General, and won the election in 1855.  He died August 15, 1856, and was succeeded as Attorney General by Christopher P. Wolcott of Summit County by appointment of Governor Salmon P. Chase.

Notes

References

County district attorneys in Ohio
People from Medina County, Ohio
Ohio Attorneys General
Ohio Republicans
Ohio lawyers
1820 births
1856 deaths
19th-century American politicians
19th-century American lawyers